Rälla is a locality situated in Borgholm Municipality, Kalmar County, Sweden with 407 inhabitants in 2010.

References 

Populated places in Borgholm Municipality